Scream Aim Fire is the second studio album by Welsh heavy metal band Bullet for My Valentine. The album was released on 28 January 2008 in the United Kingdom and the preceding day in the United States through Jive Records. Since its release, Scream Aim Fire has sold over 1,400,000 copies worldwide. It is the band's most commercially successful effort in Australia, earning a gold certification by the Australian Recording Industry Association (ARIA) in addition to a gold certification from both the band's native British Phonographic Industry (BPI) and the Bundesverband Musikindustrie (BVMI) in Germany.

In contrast to Bullet for My Valentine's debut, The Poison (2005), Scream Aim Fire explores a thrash metal style in addition to the band's melodic metalcore sound.

Music style and background
Scream Aim Fire style is different from the style of Bullet for My Valentine's previous album The Poison; Scream Aim Fire has less screaming than The Poison, but had much more aggressive instrumentation than The Poison. Scream Aim Fire features a thrash metal style in addition to their previously established metalcore sound.

Release
Scream Aim Fire went straight to number 5 in the UK album Charts and number 4 in the Australian album charts.  Additionally, the album hit No. 4 on the Billboard 200, with first week sales of about 53,000. Since its release, Scream Aim Fire has sold over 1,000,000 copies worldwide.

The title track of the album is featured in the video game Guitar Hero World Tour. The track "Waking the Demon" is available for download for both Rock Band and Rock Band 2 for the price of $1.99. "Scream Aim Fire", "Tears Don't Fall", as well as, "Your Betrayal" are available on Rockband 3 in a pack for $5.49 for the three or $1.99 Individually. The track "Hearts Burst into Fire" is featured in the video game NHL 09.

Writing and recording
Recording of the album was complete in November 2007 with vocalist/guitarist Matthew Tuck telling Kerrang! magazine he was looking forward to be working with guest producer Alec Cartio again.

Release and promotion
At midnight on 28 January, Bullet for My Valentine were present in Cardiff to do an album signing to go with the release of the album. At 18:00 the same day, they did a 20-minute performance at HMV in Oxford Circus with 300 present to get their album signed.

A 15-minute album commentary was released on the US digital single for "Scream Aim Fire", released on 18 December 2007, along with the track "Eye of the Storm", which was also released on a free Kerrang! CD and as a free download for signing up to the Sony BMG mailing list.

The second single from the album, "Hearts Burst into Fire", was announced by the band during their UK tour. Matt Tuck said that the band recorded the song live for the music video.

"Waking the Demon" is the third and final single of the album.

Track listing

DVDs

Japanese limited edition DVD
 "Scream Aim Fire" music video
 The Making of "Scream Aim Fire"
 Bullet TV:
 Welcome to the Studio
 Sonic Ranch Cribs
 Night at the Ranch
 Quad Pinching
 Photo Gallery
 Scream Aim Fire: The Comics

Deluxe edition DVD
 3 music videos:
 Scream Aim Fire
 Waking the Demon
 Hearts Burst into Fire
 Bullet TV:
 Drinking
 Switzerland
 Japan
 Travel to Oz
 Australia/New Zealand

USB edition
Bullet for My Valentine have also released the album on a metal bullet-shaped Flash Drive with the band's symbol engraved into it. The bullet-shaped Flash Drive has the same properties as the Special Edition CD, with the inclusion of a 15-minute track-by-track video commentary, 4 wallpapers, and the booklet/insert in PDF format.

Personnel
Credits adapted from the CD liner notes.

Bullet for My Valentine
 Matthew Tuck – lead vocals, rhythm guitar, guitar solo intro on "Say Goodnight" and "Hearts Burst into Fire", guitar solo on "Take It Out on Me", bass (uncredited)
 Michael "Padge" Paget – lead guitar, backing vocals
 Michael "Moose" Thomas – drums
 Jason "Jay" James –  backing vocals, bass (credited but doesn't perform)

Additional musicians
 Benji Webbe – additional vocals/lyrics on "Take It Out on Me"

Production
Colin Richardson – producer, mixing at Strongroom Studios, London
Matt Hyde – engineering
Ginge Ford – engineering
Jeff Rose – engineering
Ted Jensen – mastering at Sterling Sound, New York City

Art
 Jeff Gilligan – art direction, design
 Don Clark – photo-illustrations for Invisible Creature
 Chapman Baehler – photography

Charts

Weekly charts

Year-end charts

Singles

Certifications

References

Bullet for My Valentine albums
2008 albums
Jive Records albums
Albums recorded at Sonic Ranch